Union sportive dacquoise, also known as US Dax, is a French rugby union club currently playing in Nationale, the third level of the French league system.

They were founded in 1904. They play at Stade Maurice Boyau (capacity 16,170). They wear red and white. They are based in Dax in the Landes département of Nouvelle-Aquitaine.

Honours
 French championship:
 Runners-up: 1956, 1961, 1963, 1966, 1973
 Challenge Yves du Manoir:
 Champions: 1957, 1959, 1969, 1971, 1982

Finals results

French championship

Current standings

Current squad

The squad for the 2020–21 season is:

Notable former players

 
  Horacio Agulla
  Federico Martín Aramburú
  Lucas Borges
  Roberto Grau
  Ignacio Mieres
  Juan Pablo Socino
  Nicolás Vergallo
  Fotunuupule Auelua
  Matt Henjak
  Morgan Turinui
  Al Charron
  Joseph Mbu
  Fero Lasagavibau
  Neumi Nanuku
  Saula Radidi
  Nemia Soqeta
  Paul Albaladejo
  Pierre Albaladejo
  Raymond Albaladejo
  Benoît August
  Jean-Louis Azarete
  David Banquet
  Jean-Pierre Bastiat
  Jean-Louis Bérot
  Maurice Biraben
  Anthony Bouthier
  Maurice Boyau
  Julien Brugnaut
  Georges Capdepuy
  Philippe Carbonneau
  Stéphane Castaignède
  Cyril Cazeaux
  Arthur Chollon
  René Crabos
  Claude Darbos
  Pierre Darbos
  Jean Desclaux
  Claude Dourthe
  Richard Dourthe
  Mathieu Dourthe
  Claude Dufau
  Gérard Dufau
  Sébastien Fauqué
  Philippe Gimbert
  Pascal Giordani
  Abel Guichemerre
  Arnaud Héguy
  Jacques Ibañez
  Raphaël Ibañez
  Olivier Klemenczak
  Simon Labouyrie
  Charles Lacazedieu
  Julien Laharrague
  Nicolas Laharrague
  Thierry Lacroix
  Paul Lasaosa
  Jean-Claude Lasserre
  Bernard Lavigne
  Jean-Patrick Lescarboura
  Matthieu Lièvremont
  Thomas Lièvremont
  Ludovic Loustau
  Jean-Pierre Lux
  Olivier Magne
  Christophe Milhères
  Ugo Mola
  Benjamin Noirot
  Fabien Pelous
  Maxime Petitjean
  Julien Peyrelongue
  Toki Pilioko
  Laurent Rodriguez
  Olivier Roumat
  Marc Sallefranque
  Julien Saubade
  Nicolas Spanghero
  Irakli Giorgadze
  Tariel Ratianidze
  Clemens von Grumbkow
  Aidan McCullen
  David Bortolussi
  Laurent Travini
  P. J. van Lill
  Charlie Hore
  Petru Bălan
  Gabriel Brezoianu
  Iulian Dumitraș
  Kas Lealamanua
  Justin Purdie
  Kane Thompson
  Gavin Williams
  Craig Smith
  Jannie Bornman
  Jacques-Louis Potgieter
  Paea Faʻanunu
  Mafileo Kefu
  Joe Tuineau
  Mario Sagario
  Liam Davies

See also
 List of rugby union clubs in France
 Rugby union in France

Footnotes

References

External links
  Union sportive dacquoise official website
  Allezdax.com website